The United States Air Force's 5th Expeditionary Space Operations Squadron is an expeditionary satellite operations unit, assigned to Air Force Space Command to activate or inactivate as needed.

History

The 5th Expeditionary Space Operations Squadron (ESOPS) was formed by the Air Force Satellite Control Facility. The squadron was provisionally activated as Operating Location-A, 750th Space Group, on October 1, 1992. This satellite control facility established one of the Air Force's satellite operations locations. AFSCF was later divided into the 2nd Space Test Group and the Consolidated Space Test Center (CSTC) on October 1, 1987, when AFSPC took over Onizuka Air Force Base, now Onizuka Air Station. OL-A encompassed the CSTC divisions of VOS, VOE, and VOD. The 5 ESOPS was officially activated 22 November 1993, under the 50th Operations Group and within one year, the 21st Space Operations Squadron (SOS) absorbed the roles of the 2nd Satellite Tracking Group Operations Division and the 1999th Communications Squadron Operations Division. After 1995 Base Realignment and Closure Committee directed the realignment of Onizuka AFS, the 21st SOS absorbed the roles of the 750th Space Group and all subordinate units and the 5th Space Operations Squadron.

Three weeks later, in late 1993, the squadron activated as the 5th Space Operations Squadron and launched a DSCS III and a NATO IV communication satellite, supported NASA's Hubble telescope repair, and activated as the 5th Space Operations Squadron. The squadron has launched the IUS in support of NASA programs including all seven TDRS and three inter-planetary spacecraft: Galileo (Jupiter), Magellan (Venus), and Ulysses (Sun).

Lineage
 Constituted as the 5th Satellite Control Squadron on 11 April 1989
 Activated on 1 May 1989
 Redesignated as the 5th Space Operations Squadron on 30 January 1992
 Inactivated on 31 July 1992
 Activated on 22 November 1993
 Inactivated on 13 June 2000
 Redesignated as the 5th Expeditionary Space Operations Squadron and converted to provisional status on 5 December 2007

Assignments
 1000th Satellite Operations Group, 1 May 1989 – 31 July 1992
 50th Operations Group, 22 November 1993 – 13 June 2000
 Air Force Space Command to activate or inactivate at any time after 5 December 2007

Locations
 Fairchild Air Force Base, Washington, 1 May 1989 – 31 July 1992
 Onizuka Air Force Station, California, 22 November 1993 – 13 June 2000

Satellites operated
 Defense Satellite Communications System III (1993–1995)
 NATO III (1993–1995)
 SkyNet IV (1993–1995)
 Inertial Upper Stage (1993–1995)
 Tracking and Data Relay Satellite

References

Notes

Bibliography

External links
 Onizuka AFS Chronology
 21SOPS Fact Sheet
 Globalsecurity.org 5SOPS page

Space Operations 0005
Military units and formations in Florida